Tolksdorf may refer to:

 the Polish village of Tołkiny
 Klaus Tolksdorf (born 1948), German Federal Judge